Simple Love is the seventh album by American folk rock musician David Dondero, released on August 24, 2007 by Team Love Records. It came two years after his first release with Team Love, South of the South.

Track listing
 The Prince William Sound
 When the Heart Breaks Deep
 Rothko Chapel
 Stuck on the Moon
 Simple Love
 You Don't Love Anyone
 Mighty Mississip!
 One Legged Man and the Three Legged Dog
 Lone Rose
 Double Murder Ballad Suicide

Music videos
 Rothko Chapel directed and animated by Alexandra Valenti and Holly Bronko

References

External links
 Simple Love at Team Love

2007 albums
David Dondero albums
Team Love Records albums